General elections were held in Kenya Colony between 18 and 26 May 1963. Voters elected members of the House of Representatives and Senate. The election was the last before independence later in the year.

The result was a victory for the Kenya African National Union (KANU), which won 83 of the 124 seats in the House of Representatives and 18 of the 38 seats in the Senate. Five seats in the House and three in the Senate remained unfilled due to a secessionist conflict on the border with Somalia.

Campaign

A total of 275 candidates contested the elections for the House of Representatives; 90 from KANU, 59 from the Kenya African Democratic Union (KADU), 20 from the African People's Party (APP), five from the Baluhya Political Union (BPU), three from the Coast People's Party and 98 independents.

KADU, the APP and the BPU agreed to work together to try to defeat KANU.

Conduct
Pre-election violence occurred in Kangundo when a group of Kamba attacked KANU supporters, injuring fourteen people. Eleven people were arrested after KADU supporters were attacked outside party offices in Kitale.

Results

House of Representatives

Senate
The Nyanza Province African Union won its seat unopposed, whilst KANU (five) and KADU (four) won a further nine unopposed.

References

Kenya
Elections in Kenya
1963 in Kenya
British Kenya
Election and referendum articles with incomplete results
May 1963 events in Africa